HMCS Galiano was a Canadian government fisheries patrol vessel pressed into service with the Royal Canadian Navy in 1917 during the First World War. Used for patrol and assessment duties on the West Coast of Canada, Galiano disappeared in a storm in October 1918, making her Canada's only warship lost during the First World War.

Description
The vessel had a gross register tonnage (GRT) of 393. The vessel was powered by a single steam-powered triple-expansion engine driving one shaft creating . In Royal Canadian Navy service, the vessel had a complement of 33.

Construction and career
The vessel was constructed by Dublin Dockyard in Dublin, Ireland, in 1913. Galiano was a steel-hulled, single-screw vessel launched on 18 October 1913 and completed in December 1913. The sister ship of CGS Malaspina, the vessel was acquired by the Canadian government in 1914 for service on the West Coast of Canada as a fisheries patrol vessel.

Galiano arrived in Esquimalt, British Columbia, on 21 February 1914 to start her duties in the fisheries protection service as a patrol boat with the prefix Canadian Government Ship (CGS). After the First World War broke out, Galiano and sister ship Malaspina alternated between naval and civic duties along the Pacific coast, being retained as part of the government fleet. This included performing examination duties at Esquimalt. Galiano was commissioned in the Royal Canadian Navy on 15 December 1917 and given the prefix His Majesty's Canadian Ship (HMCS). Lieutenant R. M. Pope of the Royal Canadian Naval Volunteer Reserve was given command of the vessel.

Loss

In late October 1918, Galiano, just returned from the Queen Charlotte Islands (now Haida Gwaii) and, in need of some repair, was sent with supplies to the light house at Triangle Island off Cape Scott at the northwestern tip of Vancouver Island. A number of her regular crew were unable to make the trip due to illness as the 1918 flu pandemic had reached her base at Esquimalt. She set out towards the Queen Charlotte Islands from Triangle Island at 5 pm on 29 October 1918. When she made her only distress call at 3 am the next morning, she was estimated to be within visual range of the light at Cape St. James  from Triangle Island. She was never heard from again and went down with the loss of all hands. At the time of her distress call, there were heavy seas running at her location in Queen Charlotte Sound. Galiano was lost just days after  ran aground on Vanderbilt Reef, near Skagway, Alaska also in heavy weather.

The Naval Memorial in Ross Bay Cemetery, Vancouver Island, British Columbia bears the names of 39 officers and men who were lost at sea. Of these, 36 were from HMCS Galiano, which sank on 30 October 1918.

Legacy 
In honour of Galiano and her crew, Canadian Forces Fleet School Esquimalt (CFFS(E)) named its damage control training facility after the lost ship.  Located in Colwood, British Columbia, DCTF Galiano houses multiple-storey flood and fire simulators and utilizes complex freshwater flooding and propane fire systems.  The simulators are designed as realistic mock-ups of Canadian naval vessels to provide controlled emergency environments in which sailors are trained to respond to ruptured pipes, flooding compartments, engine-room fires, aircraft crashes, and electrical emergencies.

Citations

Sources

External links
 Canada's only lost Warship
 HMCS Galiano
 Converted civilian vessels

Patrol vessels of the Royal Canadian Navy
1913 ships
Auxiliary ships of the Royal Canadian Navy
Canadian Government Ship